This is a list of the Members of Parliament appointed as Steward of the Manor of Hempholme, a notional 'office of profit under the crown' which was used to resign from the House of Commons. The last steward vacated the post in 1866 after being re-elected to the House of Commons.

Stewards

See also
List of Stewards of the Chiltern Hundreds
List of Stewards of the Manor of East Hendred
List of Stewards of the Manor of Northstead
List of Stewards of the Manor of Old Shoreham
List of Stewards of the Manor of Poynings

References

Hempholme